The 8th Paratroopers Engineer Regiment "Folgore" is the Italian Army's airborne combat engineer unit. The regiment provides close combat support to the Paratroopers Brigade "Folgore".

History

8th Engineer Regiment 
On 1 October 1922 the 7th Army Corps Engineer Grouping was formed in Rome, which received the Sappers Battalion and the Telegraphers Battalion of the IX Army Corps, and a miners company from the disbanded Miners Engineer Regiment. The grouping consisted of a command, a sappers-miners battalion, a telegraphers battalion, a photo-electricians company, five dovecotes (in Rome, Perugia, Cagliari, Ozieri, and La Maddalena), and a depot. In May 1923 the grouping received a detachment in Ozieri in Sardinia, which had been formed by the 6th Army Corps Engineer Grouping a month earlier. In July the detachment was renamed Mixed Detachment Sardinia and consisted of a sappers-miners company, a telegraphers company, three dovecotes in Cagliari, Ozieri, and La Maddalena, which had been transferred from the 7th Army Corps Engineer Grouping, and the detachment's branch depot in Ozieri. On 20 October 1926 the grouping was renamed 8th Engineer Regiment and on 25 October the detachment in Sardinia became autonomous as Mixed Engineer Battalion Sardinia.

On 28 October 1932 the regiment received the III Battalion of the disbanded 1st Radio-Telegraphers Regiment. On 5 May 1933 the regiment received an Aerostat Company and a Photographers Company, which were combined in the Aerostat and Photographers Battalion. On 1 January 1935 the battalion was renamed Special Battalion and on the same date the aerostat company was reorganized as Experimental Aerostatic Section.

For the Second Italo-Ethiopian War the regiment formed the following units in 1935:
 XV Radio-Telegraphers Battalion
 XV Telegraphers Battalion
 I Connections Battalion
 and photographic, telephotographic, cinematographic, and photo-electricians companies and sections

In 1936 the regiment formed the following units for service in Ethiopia:
 II Connections Battalion
 III Connections Battalion
 XXXV Engineer Battalion
 XXXVI Engineer Battalion
 XVI Telegraphers Battalion
 three marching battalions with replacement personnel for the units already deployed in Ethiopia
 and various minor units

At the end of 1936 the regiment consists of a command, engineer battalion, radio-telegraphers battalion, special battalion, two dovecotes, and a depot. In January 1937 the telegraphers and radio-telegraphers battalions were renamed connections battalions. All through 1937 the regiment continued to train and deploy personnel as replacements for units in Ethiopia.

World War II 

With the outbreak of World War II the regiment's depot began to mobilize new units:

 Command of the 8th Engineer Grouping
 Command of the 10th Engineer Grouping
 Command of the 30th Special Grouping
 CCIII Mixed Engineer Battalion (for the 3rd CC.NN. Division "21 Aprile")
 II Engineer Battalion
 XL Special Battalion
 X Marconists Battalion (for the Army General Staff)
 X Telegraphers Battalion
 Water Battalion
 and many smaller units

The 8th and 10th engineer groupings were engaged in coastal defense and air defense construction work. The 
30th Special Grouping was formed on 15 May 1943 and took command of two connections battalions in Rome. On 16 July 1943 the grouping was renamed 30th Special Telecommunications Grouping. All three groupings and the 8th Engineer Regiment were disbanded by invading German forces after the announcement of the Armistice of Cassibile on 8 September 1943.

VIII Paratroopers Sappers Battalion 

In 1940 Italy began to form its first combat engineer units and members of the speciality were named "Guastatori" (Sappers) and attended courses at the army's Combat Engineer School in Civitavecchia. A Guastatori platoon consisted of two combat engineer teams equipped with Model 38 submachine guns, hand grenades, and bangalore torpedoes, and two support teams equipped with heavy machine guns and M28 lightmortars. Guastatori battalions were formed for the army's paratroopers and alpine divisions.

The VIII Paratroopers Battalion was formed by the Royal Air Force Paratroopers School in Tarquinia in the first months of 1942 with the 22nd, 23rd, and 24th paratroopers companies and a headquarters company. Once the parachute training was completed the battalion was assigned to the 3rd Paratroopers Regiment. In May 1942 the battalion was sent to the Combat Engineer School in Civitavecchia. Training was usually reserved for engineers, but due to the need for sappers for the planned air assault landing on Malta it was decided to train paratroopers. After training in Civitavecchia the VIII Paratroopers Sappers Battalion was sent to Bagnoli to attend a course held by German combat engineers.

The Royal Italian Army had activated a Paratroopers Division on 1 September 1941, which on 27 July 1942 was renamed 185th Infantry Division "Folgore" and deployed to Libya. The battalion, minus the 23rd Paratroopers Sappers Company, which remained in Italy to train the Guastatori of the 184th Paratroopers Division "Nembo", fought in the Western Desert Campaign until the Second Battle of El Alamein, where the division and battalion were destroyed.

CLXXXIV Mixed Engineer Battalion 

On 24 September 1944 the Italian Co-Belligerent Army formed in Faicchio the CLXXXIV Mixed Engineer Battalion for the Combat Group "Folgore". The battalion consisted of the 10th Engineer Company drawn from the 30th Infantry Division "Sabauda", and the 184th Engineer Company and 184th Connections Company, which were both drawn from the 184th Paratroopers Division "Nembo". Before the battalion was formally activated the personnel of the 129th Connections Company of the Puglia-Lucania Command was merged into the 184th Connections Company. In March 1945 the battalion also received a field park company. The battalion distinguished itself in spring 1945 in combat along the Santerno river. For its conduct during the Italian campaign the battalion was awarded a Bronze Medal of Military Valour.

Cold War 

On 15 October 1945 the Combat Group "Folgore" was renamed Infantry Division "Folgore". On 1 January 1947 the division was reorganized and the CLXXXIV Mixed Engineer Battalion split to form the Connections Battalion "Folgore" and the Engineer Battalion "Folgore" in Vittorio Veneto. In 1953 the battalion moved to Villa Vicentina.

During the 1975 army reform the army disbanded the regimental level and newly independent battalions were granted for the first time their own flags. During the reform engineer battalions were named for a lake if they supported a corps or named for a river if they supported a division or brigade. On 1 November 1975 the Engineer Battalion "Folgore" was renamed 184th Engineer Battalion "Santerno" and assigned the flag and traditions of the 8th Engineer Regiment. The battalion consisted of a command, a command and park company, and two engineer companies.

The battalion was assigned to the Mechanized Division "Folgore" until the division was disbanded on 1 August 1986. On the same date the battalion was transferred to the 5th Army Corps' Engineer Command. The same year the battalion was renamed 8th Sappers Battalion "Santerno" and now consisted of a command, a command and services company, three sappers companies, and a special equipment company.

On 10 September 1992 the battalion was disbanded and the next day the 8th Engineer Regiment was reformed with the personnel and materiel of the disbanded battalion. On 30 November 1995 the regiment was disbanded and its flag transferred to the Shrine of the Flags in the Vittoriano in Rome.

Recent times 

On 1 June 2001 the 8th Paratroopers Sappers Battalion was reformed in Legnago by renaming the 5th Paratroopers Engineer Battalion "Bolsena" of the Paratroopers Brigade "Folgore". The battalion received the flag and traditions of the 8th Engineer Regiment, and the traditions of the VIII Paratroopers Sappers Battalion and CLXXXIV Mixed Engineer Battalion, while the flag of the 5th Engineer Regiment was transferred to the Shrine of the Flags in the Vittoriano.

The 8th Paratroopers Sappers Battalion consisted of a command, a command and tactical support company, and four paratroopers sappers companies. The companies were given their historical numbering: 22nd, 23rd and 24th; with the fourth company being numbered 21st to commemorate the 21st Paratroopers Company of the VII Paratroopers Battalion, which fought with the VIII Paratroopers Sappers Battalion in the Ruspoli Group during the Second Battle of El Alamein.

On 13 October 2004 the 8th Paratroopers Sappers Battalion entered the reformed 8th Paratroopers Engineer Regiment "Folgore".

International operations 
The regiment participated in the following international operations:

 Kosovo: Kosovo Force
 Afghanistan: Operation Enduring Freedom
 Afghanistan: International Security Assistance Force (ISAF)
 Iraq: Operation Ancient Babylon
 Lebanon: Operation Leonte
 Central African Republic: EUFOR CAR (Central African Republic)

Current structure 

As of 2023 the 8th Paratroopers Engineer Regiment "Folgore" consists of:

  Regimental Command, in Legnano
 Command and Logistic Support Squadron "Leoni" ("Lions")
 8th Paratroopers Sappers Battalion
 21st Paratroopers Sappers Company "Giaguari" ("Jaguars")
 22nd Paratroopers Sappers Company "Angeli Neri" ("Black Angels")
 23rd Paratroopers Sappers Company "Cinghiali" ("Boars")
 24th Deployment Support Company "Tigri" ("Tigers")

The Command and Logistic Support Company fields the following platoons: C3 Platoon, Transport and Materiel Platoon, Medical Platoon, Commissariat Platoon, and EOD Platoon. Each of the two sappers companies fields a Command Platoon, an Advanced Combat Reconnaissance Teams Platoon, and two sappers platoons. The Deployment Support Company and Mobility Support Company field the battalion's heavy military engineering vehicles: Biber bridgelayers, Dachs armored engineer vehicles, cranes, excavators, Medium Girder Bridges etc. The sappers companies and Command and Logistic Support Company are equipped with VTLM "Lince" and VTMM "Orso" vehicles.

External links 
 Italian Army Website: 8° Reggimento Genio Guastatori Paracadutisti "Folgore"

References 

Engineer Regiments of Italy
Military units and formations established in 1922
Military units and formations disestablished in 1943
Military units and formations established in 1992
Military units and formations disestablished in 1995
Military units and formations established in 2004